Bat*21 is a 1988 American war film directed by Peter Markle, and adapted from the book by William C. Anderson, novelist and retired United States Air Force colonel. Set during the Vietnam War, the film is a dramatization based upon the rescue of a U.S. air navigator shot down behind enemy lines in Vietnam. The film stars Gene Hackman and Danny Glover with Jerry Reed, David Marshall Grant, Clayton Rohner, Erich Anderson and Joe Dorsey in supporting roles.

Plot
During the last days of the Vietnam War, USAF Lieutenant colonel Iceal E. "Gene" Hambleton (Gene Hackman) call sign BAT-21 Bravo, is flying on board an EB-66C electronic warfare aircraft, engaged in electronic countermeasures preparatory to a major bombing strike. Without warning, a number of SA-2 Guideline SAMs are launched from North Vietnam, targeting their aircraft. A massive SAM explosion tears off the tail and Hambleton, in the navigator's position, ejects as the sole survivor of the six-man crew.

While still coming down by parachute, Hambleton makes radio contact with Captain Bartholomew "Birddog" Clark (Danny Glover), the pilot of a Cessna O-2 Skymaster, flying a forward air control mission near where the EB-66 was destroyed. Birddog becomes Hambleton's link to rescue.

Hambleton, an expert on electronic weapons systems and who holds valuable information, is known to the North Vietnamese, who begin an all-out search, attempting to capture him. An effort to steal supplies from Vietnamese villagers is not successful, as Hambleton is discovered and kills an aggressive peasant farmer, apologizing to his grieving family as he escapes.

Knowing that his current location is too dangerous for rescue aircraft, Hambleton devises a plan to reach safer territory. He plots a course to the river which is the boundary of the target area, then communicates his intended path to Clark in a code composed of various golf courses he knows well. This will allow the rescuers to keep track of his progress, making it easier for them to pick him up.

Several attempts are made to recover Hambleton. Two helicopters are lost and members of its crews are killed or captured. Clark ultimately flies a "Huey" helicopter rescue mission, but as he retrieves Hambleton, the pair are shot down by ground fire, with Clark being wounded. An F-100 bombing raid both assists and hinders their progress through the jungle, as North Vietnamese irregulars are trailing them. In the end, Hambleton and Clark are rescued by a US river boat patrolling nearby on the Cam Lo River.

Historical accuracy

Portions of Bat*21 were highly dramatized, including the climactic battle. Some characters were composites of real people, while others were created for the film. However, some other details were accurate, including that rescuer Captain Larry Potts was African American.

The actual rescue took over 11 days, during which a major attack was delayed, resulting in numerous South Vietnamese soldiers being killed and wounded. A Forward Air Observer aircraft was shot down and USAF 1Lt Bruce Walker and USMC 1Lt Larry Potts parachuted to the ground safely, eluding capture. In an ensuing attack, six more Americans lost their lives attempting to rescue him. The North Vietnamese, alerted by the intense efforts to find the flyer, increased their efforts to find Hambleton. Walker was discovered and killed by the Vietnamese forces. During a covert nighttime operation more than  behind enemy lines, Hambleton was finally rescued in a land operation by U.S. Navy SEAL Lt. j.g. Thomas R. Norris and VNN Petty Officer Third Class Nguyen Van Kiet.

Cast

Gene Hackman as Lieutenant Colonel Iceal Hambleton
Danny Glover as Captain Bartholomew Clark (Call sign: "Birddog")
Jerry Reed as Colonel George Walker
David Marshall Grant as WO1 Ross Carver ('Jolly Green' Pilot)
Clayton Rohner as Sergeant Harley Rumbaugh
Erich Anderson as Major Jake Scott
Joe Dorsey as Colonel Douglass
Reverend Michael Ng as Vietnamese Man
Theodore Chan Woei-Shyong as Boy on Bridge
Don Ruffin as Helicopter Crew Member
Scott A. Howell as Helicopter Crew Member
Michael Raden as Helicopter Crew Member
Timothy Fitzgerald as EB-66 Officer
Stuart Hagen as EB-66 Officer
Jeff Baxter as Helicopter Gunner
Alan King as Helicopter Gunner
Bonnie Yong as NVA/VC Officer
Willie Lai as NVA/VC Officer

Martin Yong as NVA/VC Soldier
Jim Aman as NVA/VC Soldier
Freddie Chin as NVA/VC Soldier
Dennis Chong as NVA/VC Soldier
Liow Hui Chun as NVA/VC Soldier
Fung Yun Khiong as NVA/VC Soldier
Henry Lee as NVA/VC Soldier
Michael Lee as NVA/VC Soldier
Jeffrey Liew as NVA/VC Soldier
Fredolin Leong as NVA/VC Soldier
Benedict Lojingkau as NVA/VC Soldier
Johnny Michael as NVA/VC Soldier
Clarence Mojikon as NVA/VC Soldier
Wilod Nuin as NVA/VC Soldier
Harold Sinpang as NVA/VC Soldier
Paul Yong as NVA/VC Soldier
Conidon Wong as NVA VC Soldier

Production

Bat*21 was filmed entirely on location in Sabah, Malaysia, with the assistance of the Malaysian government. Resources, locations and other assistance were supplied by the Malaysian Army and the Royal Malaysian Air Force, which also supplied aircraft and pilots, including the services of Captain V. Thiagarajah, who flew both on- and off-camera.

Helicopters used for the filming included Bell UH-1N ‘Huey’s’, and Sea King helicopters of the Royal Malaysian Air Force.

Fighter jets used were F-5 Tigersharks.

Release
The film premiered in the Philippines on September 8, 1988, a month before it premiered in the United States on October 21.

Reception
Film historian Alun Evans in Brassey's Guide to War Films, considered the production an unusual look at "... the perspective of a service non-combatant." In a contemporary review, Roger Ebert noted: "'BAT*21' is the kind of lean, no-nonsense war film Hollywood used to make back before the subject became burdened with metaphysical insights." Listed in the "best" category of "The Best (and Worst) War Movies of All Time", Popular Mechanics, characterized Bat*21 as the "Best Vietnam War Movie."

References

Notes

Citations

Bibliography

Anderson, William C. BAT-21: Based on the true story of Lieutenant Colonel Iceal E. Hambleton, USAF. Englewood Cliffs, New Jersey: Prentice-Hall, 1980. .
Evans, Alun. Brassey's Guide to War Films. Dulles, Virginia: Potomac Books, 2000. .

External links

1988 films
1980s war films
American war adventure films
American aviation films
1980s English-language films
Films about shot-down aviators
Films about the United States Air Force
Films directed by Peter Markle
Films scored by Christopher Young
TriStar Pictures films
Vietnam War aviation films
Vietnam War films
War films based on actual events
1980s American films